Branimir Spasić (born 1986) is a politician in Serbia. He has served in the National Assembly of Serbia since 2020 as a member of the Serbian Progressive Party.

Private career
Spasić lives in Lebane. He works as a lawyer.

Politician
Spasić received the 177th position Progressive Party's Aleksandar Vučić — For Our Children list in the 2020 Serbian parliamentary election and was elected when the list won a landslide majority with 188 out of 250 mandates. He had not previously been a candidate for election to any level of government. He is a member of the assembly committee on administrative, budget, mandate, and immunity issues; a member of the committee on labour, social issues, social inclusion, and poverty reduction; a deputy member of the committee on the judiciary, public administration, and local self-government; and a member of the parliamentary friendship groups with Brazil, Canada, China, Denmark, Greece, Iceland, Japan, Qatar, Russia, the United Arab Emirates, the United Kingdom, and the United States of America.

References

1986 births
Living people
People from Lebane
Members of the National Assembly (Serbia)
Serbian Progressive Party politicians